The name Mayola, a variant of the name 'May', is a female name which means 'born in the month of May'. The name 'May' derives from Maia, the name of a Roman goddess. The name could also refer to hawthorn flower that blossoms in the month of May. The month May is also known as 'Marian Month' for Roman Catholics which is dedicated to Mother Mary. The name is of a Latin origin and pronounced as MEY-OW-LAH. The name is very rare and unique in present times.

As given name
 Mayola Biboko, Congolese-Belgian footballer
 Mayola Williams, respondent in the US Supreme Court case in 2007 Philip Morris USA v. Williams

As family name
 Freddy Mayola, Cuban sprinter

See also
 Maiola Kalili, American swimmer
 Mariola (disambiguation)
 Moyola (disambiguation)
 Myola
 Maloya

References

Given names
English feminine given names